On the Harmful Effects of Tobacco is a one-act play by Anton Chekhov. It has one character, Ivan Ivanovich Nyukhin. First published in 1886, the play was revised by Chekhov and is best known from his 1902 version. This was first published in English in The Unknown Chekhov (1954), a collection of writings.

Plot
The action takes place in a town hall. Nyukhin has been told by his wife to give a lecture about "the harmful effects of tobacco," although he is a smoker. He emphasizes that this will be a dry and boring lecture, but always postpones the actual subject by talking about his problems with his domineering wife.

"I must tell you, by the way, that my wife runs a boarding school. Well, not exactly a boarding school, but something in the nature of one. Just between us, my wife likes to complain about hard times, but she has put away a little nest egg... some forty or fifty thousand rubles. As for me, I haven't a kopek to my name, not a penny... "

He wants to stand up against his wife, he wants to run away, to forget and to be alone. He throws off his old, shabby waistcoat (a metaphor for himself), but suddenly picks it back up, because

"She is here. My wife is there in the wings waiting for me."

By the end of the monologue, Nyukhin has said hardly anything relevant about the harmful effects of tobacco, but asks the audience not to betray him:

"If she asks you, please, I beg you, tell her that her scarecrow husband, I mean, the lecturer, me, behaved with dignity."

Publication history
The play was originally published on 17 February 1886 by Peterburgskaya Gazeta, subtitled "The Monologue scene"  (Сцена-монолог) and signed A. Chekhonte (А. Чехонте). Later that year, in a revised version it was included into the Moscow-published Motley Stories (Пестрые рассказы) collection.

Later Chekhov continued to revise it, until the better-known 1902 version was included into the volume 14 of the Complete Works by A.P. Chekhov published by Adolf Marks in 1903. The first English publication was in The Unknown Chekhov (1954), a collection of writings.

Film adaptation
Paul Newman directed a short film adaptation of On The Harmful Effects of Tobacco that received limited screening in New York City in 1962.  Nyukhin was played by Michael Strong, who had performed the monologue to high praise in The Actors Studio.  Despite a favorable mention in The New York Times, Newman removed his name from the credits for reasons that remain unclear.  He gave the sole print to Strong, who kept it until his death in 1980.  As of November 2016, Turner Classic Movies plans to air the film in early 2017.

The play was also adapted and set to music composed by American Dominick Argento, in his A Water Bird Talk (1974–1976); he also used passages (and images in performance) from Audubon's Birds of America.

References

 Schmidt Paul, The Plays of Anton Chekhov, A New Translation, Harper Perennial

External links
 On the Harmful Effects of Smoking, Full Text

Plays by Anton Chekhov
Monodrama